Dark Shadows: The Christmas Presence is a Big Finish Productions audio drama based on the long-running American horror soap opera series Dark Shadows.

Plot 
As Christmas draws near, Quentin Collins issues an arcane invitation into the unknown. Meanwhile, as children are reported missing across Collinsport, the festive season brings Collinwood new terrors, when a persuasive spirit seeks to divide and conquer...

Cast
Quentin Collins – David Selby
Angelique – Lara Parker
Willie Loomis – John Karlen
Maggie Evans – Kathryn Leigh Scott
Barnabas Collins – Andrew Collins
The Visitor/Professor Timothy Eliot Stokes – Toby Longworth
The Child – Thomas Grant
Grandmother – Rita Davies

External links
- Dark Shadows: The Christmas Presence

Christmas Presence
2007 audio plays
Works by Scott Handcock